Francis Faulkner may refer to:

Francis Barrett Faulkner, artist
Major Francis Faulkner, of Faulkner House

See also
Frank Faulkner (disambiguation)